Parveen Kaur is an Indian actress born in Mumbai who graduated from Sathaye College.

Kaur has been part of shows including: Ishq Unplugged, Chakravartin Ashoka Samrat, Humko Tumse Ho Gaya Hai Pyaar Kya Karein, Yeh Hai Mohabbatein, Kasam Tere Pyaar Ki, Balika Vadhu and many more. Kaur has also appeared in several films and TV commercials including: Amazon’s Apni Dukan, Franklin Templeton, Rajdhani Daal, Kurkure, and Reliance Free.

Filmography

Television

Films

References

External links

Living people
Indian soap opera actresses
Year of birth missing (living people)